The 2019 Hinckley and Bosworth Borough Council election took place on 2 May 2019 to elect members of Hinckley and Bosworth Borough Council in England. This was on the same day as other local elections. The election resulted in the Liberal Democrats gaining control of the council from the Conservatives.

Summary

Election result

|-

Ward Results

Ambien

Barlestone, Nailstone & Osbaston

Barwell

Burbage Sketchley & Stretton

Burbage St Catherine's & Lash Hill

Cadeby, Carlton & Market Bosworth with Shackerstone

Earl Shilton

Groby

Hinckley Castle

Hinckley Clarendon

Hinckley De Montfort

Hinckley Trinity

Markfield, Stanton & Field Head

Newbold Verdon with Desford & Peckleton

Ratby, Bagworth & Thornton

Twycross & Witherley with Sheepy

References 

Hinckley and Bosworth Borough Council elections
2019 English local elections
2010s in Leicestershire
May 2019 events in the United Kingdom